The 2015–16 Western Football League season (known as the 2015–16 Toolstation Western Football League for sponsorship reasons) is the 114th in the history of the Western Football League, a football competition in England. Teams are divided into two divisions; the Premier and the First. The league's constitution was announced on 11 June 2015.

Premier Division
The Premier Division was increased from 19 clubs to 21, and features four new clubs after Slimbridge were promoted to Southern League Division One South & West, and Bishop Sutton were relegated to the First Division.
Barnstaple Town, champions of the First Division.
Clevedon Town, demoted from Southern League Division One South & West for ground grading reasons.
Cribbs, third-placed club in the First Division.
Welton Rovers, runners-up in the First Division.

Seven clubs applied for promotion to Step 4: Barnstaple Town, Brislington, Bristol Manor Farm, Buckland Athletic, Odd Down, Melksham Town and Street. Odd Down failed the ground grading requirements, and Melksham's new ground will not be ready in time for next season.

League table

First Division
The First Division was reduced from 22 clubs to 21, and features two new clubs after the promotion of Barnstaple Town, Cribbs and Welton Rovers to the Premier Division:
Bishop Sutton, relegated from the Premier Division.
Chipping Sodbury Town, promoted from the Gloucestershire County League.

League table

References
 League tables

External links
 Western League Official Site

2015-16
9